Mosseri is a Hebrew surname. It may be a patronymic derivation from the name "Moses" It may also be derived from the word Masri/Misr, meaning "Egyptian"/"Egypt", i.e., may refer to a person hailing from Egypt,  cf. "Mizrahi".

Abe Mosseri (born 1974), Americanl backgammon and poker player
Adam Mosseri (born 1983), Israeli-American businessman
Emile Mosseri (born 1985), American composer, pianist, singer and producer
Ido Mosseri (born 1978), Israeli actor,musician, director and television presenter
Tal Mosseri (born 1975), Israeli actor, singer and television presenter

See also

References

Jewish surnames